is a 1994 Japanese kaiju short film directed by Kōichi Kawakita. The film served as a theme park attraction that was screened at Sanrio Puroland and Harmony Land from March 18, 1994 to July 1, 1998. It is a 3-D motion simulator featuring specially filmed sequences of Godzilla battling the monsters Mothra and Rodan. All the monsters were portrayed using the costumes and props from the early 1990s Godzilla films. In addition, a new super-plane named Earth is introduced to thwart the monsters' destructive rampage.

Cast 

 Megumi Odaka as Miki Saegusa
 Iemasa Kayumi as Professor Dreamon (voice)
 Megumi Hayashibara as Hello Kitty (voice)
 Kaneto Shiozawa as Planet pilot (voice) / G-Force soldier (voice)
 Kenpachiro Satsuma as Godzilla

Home media 
The footage from the attraction was released as a bonus feature for the Japan-only Godzilla Final Box (with the Hello Kitty footage removed, possibly due to legal issues and the short's depiction of her as a general not particularly appropriate for the character).

References

External links

Photos and info from simulator ride creator

Films set in Tokyo
Mothra
Godzilla (franchise)
Pterosaurs in fiction
Godzilla films
Japanese short films